The 2011 6 Hours of Castellet (6 Heures du Castellet) was the opening round of the 2011 Le Mans Series season. It took place at Circuit Paul Ricard on April 3, 2011. It was also the first Le Mans Series race with the two new GT classes, GTE Pro and GTE Am, contesting the event after the demise of the GT1 class.

Qualifying result
Pole position winners in each class are marked in bold.

Note: the No. 16 Pescarolo Team was demoted to the back of the grid due to a ride height infringement in qualifying.

Race
The race got off to a controversial start when the pace car did not return to the pits when the green lights came on. The front running LMPs slowed down but some of the GT cars could not react fast enough, resulting in all three GTE Pro class Porsches getting heavily damaged and retired. The GTE Am class IMSA Performance Matmut Porsche and GTE Pro JOTA Aston Martin were also caught in the carnage. The race was won overall by Pescarolo Team after their first race since 2009 after their financial troubles in 2010. LMP2 was won by Greaves Motorsport, Pegasus Racing took the FLM victory. JMW Motorsport took GTE Pro victory after a hard fought battle with the No. 51 AF Corse Ferrari towards the end. Team Felbermayr-Proton won in the GTE Am class.

Race result
Class winners in bold.  Cars failing to complete 70% of winner's distance marked as Not Classified (NC).

References

Castellet
2011
2011 in French motorsport
April 2011 sports events in France